The houses at 216–264 Ovington Ave. form a national historic district in Bay Ridge, Brooklyn, New York, New York.  It consists of 20 contributing residential buildings built between 1908 and 1910.  They are brownstone rowhouses with bowed fronts in the Neo-Renaissance style.  The houses are two or three stories in height.

It was listed on the National Register of Historic Places in 2007.

References

Renaissance Revival architecture in New York (state)
Bay Ridge, Brooklyn
Historic districts on the National Register of Historic Places in Brooklyn